David Holmes (March 10, 1769August 20, 1832) was an American politician in Virginia and Mississippi. He served five terms as a U.S. congressman from Virginia's 2nd congressional district and later was important in Mississippi's development as a state. The federal government appointed him as the fourth and last governor of the Mississippi Territory. In 1817 he was unanimously elected as the first governor of the state of Mississippi. He served a term as U.S. senator from Mississippi, appointed to fill a vacancy until elected by the legislature. Elected again as governor, he was forced to resign early due to ill health. He returned to Virginia in his last years.

Career
Born near Hanover in York County, Province of Pennsylvania, Holmes, as a child, moved with his family to Frederick County, Virginia. He attended Winchester Academy, ultimately studying law and passing the bar. He started his practice in Harrisonburg, Virginia. By adulthood, he considered himself a Virginian. He served as U.S. Representative from Virginia's 2nd congressional district, serving a total of five terms from 1797 until 1809, as he was repeatedly re-elected.

Electoral history
1797; Holmes was elected to the U.S. House of Representatives from Virginia's 2nd congressional district, with 60.4% of the vote, defeating Democratic-Republican John Bowyer and Federalist John Steele.
1799; Holmes was re-elected with 83.56% of the vote, defeating Federalist Robert Porterfield.
1801; Holmes was re-elected over Federalist Alexander Sinclair.
1803; Holmes was re-elected with 70.39% of the vote, defeating Federalist Isaac Van Meter.
1805; Holmes was re-elected unopposed.
1807; Holmes was re-elected unopposed.

Mississippi Territory
President Thomas Jefferson appointed Holmes as the fourth governor of the Mississippi Territory. Holmes was very popular, and his appointment marked the end of a long period of political factionalism within the territory. European Americans were pressing to gain more land and encroaching on Native American territory of the Chickasaw and Choctaw people.

Holmes was the last governor of the Mississippi Territory, serving from 1809 to 1817. He was generally successful in dealing with a variety of matters, including expansion, land policy, Indians, the War of 1812, and the constitutional convention of 1817 (of which he was elected president).

Often concerned with problems regarding West Florida, he had a significant role in 1810 in negotiations that led to the peaceful occupation by the United States of part of that territory. McCain (1967) concludes that Holmes's success was not based on brilliance but upon kindness, unselfishness, persuasiveness, courage, honesty, diplomacy, and intelligence.

Mississippi statehood
In 1817, Mississippi joined the United States as the 20th state. Holmes was elected unanimously as the first governor of the State of Mississippi. He took the oath of office in October 1817. However, Mississippi did not officially become a state until December. He established the state judicial system and the state militia during his term. He also organized the land east of the Pearl River, which the Choctaw people had ceded to the United States under considerable pressure.

In 1820, he was appointed as a Democratic-Republican to fill the US Senate vacancy from Mississippi caused by the resignation of Walter Leake. He was elected the same year by the state legislature (as was the practice then) as a Jackson Republican in August 1820, serving from 1821 until late 1825, when he ran for and was elected to another term as governor. He resigned as senator. Due to his declining health, he was able to serve only six months as Mississippi's fifth governor. If both territory and statehood years are counted, he is Mississippi's longest-serving governor, at over 11 years of service (10 years, 9 months, 29 days the first tenure; and 6 months, 18 days the second tenure).

Holmes returned to near Winchester, Virginia, where his health failed. He died in 1832 at Jordan White Sulphur Springs resort. He was buried in the Mt. Hebron Cemetery in Winchester. He was predeceased by his brother, Major Andrew Hunter Holmes, a casualty of the Battle of Mackinac Island during the War of 1812.

Legacy
Holmes County, Mississippi, is named in honor of him.

Holmes Avenue in Huntsville, Alabama was part of the Mississippi Territory when built and is named in honor of him.

References

Further reading

 D.H. Conrad, "David Holmes: First Governor of Mississippi," Publications of the Mississippi Historical Society, Centenary Series, vol. 4 (1921), pp. 234–257.
 Howard P. Hildreth, "David Holmes," Virginia Cavalcade, vol. 16, no. 4 (Spring 1967), pp. 38–40.
 
 Jo Anne McCormick Quatannens and Diane B. Boyle (eds.), Senators of the United States: A Historical Bibliography. Washington, DC: US Government Printing Office, 1995; pg. 136.

External links

1769 births
1832 deaths
People from York County, Pennsylvania
People of colonial Pennsylvania
Democratic-Republican Party members of the United States House of Representatives from Virginia
Democratic-Republican Party United States senators from Mississippi
Jacksonian United States senators from Mississippi
Virginia Jacksonians
Mississippi Democratic-Republicans
Mississippi Jacksonians
Governors of Mississippi Territory
Governors of Mississippi
Democratic-Republican Party state governors of the United States
Jacksonian state governors of the United States
Democratic Party governors of Mississippi
People from Adams County, Mississippi
Politicians from Winchester, Virginia